The Hamlin County Courthouse, located at 300 4th Street in Hayti, is the county courthouse serving Hamlin County, South Dakota. The courthouse was completed in 1916, two years after the Hamlin county seat was moved to Hayti from Castlewood by popular vote. Architects William W. Rose and David B. Peterson of Kansas City, Missouri designed the courthouse; their Classical Revival design was typical of contemporary courthouse architecture in South Dakota. The four-story limestone building features four Ionic columns along the front facade and an entablature with an egg-and-dart frieze and a dentillated cornice. The building has served as the seat of county government since its opening.

The courthouse was added to the National Register of Historic Places on October 12, 2000.

References

Courthouses on the National Register of Historic Places in South Dakota
County courthouses in South Dakota
Neoclassical architecture in South Dakota
Government buildings completed in 1916
Buildings and structures in Hamlin County, South Dakota
National Register of Historic Places in Hamlin County, South Dakota